The 2011 Atlantic Sun men's basketball tournament was the 33rd edition of the Atlantic Sun Conference (A-Sun)'s Men's Basketball Tournament. It took place from March 2–5, 2011 at the University Center on the campus of Mercer University in Macon, Georgia. The Belmont University Bruins won the tournament, defeating the University of North Florida Ospreys 87-46 in the final.

Format
The top eight eligible men's basketball teams in the Atlantic Sun Conference received a berth in the conference tournament.  After the 20-game conference season, teams are seeded by conference record. Florida Gulf Coast University and the University of South Carolina Upstate were not eligible to compete due to NCAA reclassification.

Bracket

Asterisk denotes game ended in overtime.

References

External links
A-Sun Men's Basketball Championship Central

-2011 Atlantic Sun men's basketball tournament
ASUN men's basketball tournament
Atlantic Sun men's basketball tournament
Atlantic Sun men's basketball tournament